Kalisindh Dam is a concrete gravity dam across Kali Sindh River.  It is situated near Jetpura village which is 16 km from  Jhalawar, Rajasthan, India.  It is built primarily for providing water for irrigation to nearby villages, control annual floods in Kali Sindh River and uplift water  to storage of 1200 mcft water for Kalisindh Thermal Power Station.

The dam has the highest number of gates (33) among all dams in Rajasthan.

References 

Dams in Rajasthan
Dams completed in 2014
2014 establishments in Rajasthan
Jhalawar district